The Viaur Viaduct (Viaduc du Viaur in French) near Aveyron, was the first large steel bridge built in France.

The 220m arch bridge was completed in 1902 under the direction of Paul-Joseph Bodin. The single track viaduct is located along the Carmaux-Rodez rail line. Built by the Société de Construction des Batignolles, it was the longest metallic arch span built up to that point in time. The viaduct contains an estimated 3800 tons of metal, with a total cost (including the masonry abutments) of around 2 700 000 French francs.

See also
 List of bridges in France

References

Viaducts in France
Bridges completed in 1902
Railway bridges in France